Ujazd  is a town in Tomaszów Mazowiecki County, Łódź Voivodeship, in central Poland. It is the seat of the gmina (administrative district) called Gmina Ujazd.

History
Ujazd was granted town rights in 1428 by Polish King Władysław II Jagiełło thanks to efforts of Piotr Tłuk, swordbearer of Łęczyca. It was a private town of Polish nobility, including the Dunin, Szczawiński, Denhoff and Ostrowski families, administratively located in the Łęczyca Voivodeship in the Greater Poland Province of the Kingdom of Poland. Its royal privileges were confirmed by Polish Kings Casimir IV Jagiellon, Sigismund III Vasa, and Stanisław August Poniatowski, in 1476, 1615 and 1786, respectively. In the 17th century, Primate of Poland Andrzej Olszowski, native of nearby Olszowa erected the Baroque Saint Adalbert Church.

During the German occupation of Poland (World War II), the occupiers operated a forced labour camp for Poles and Jews at a local sawmill.

References

Cities and towns in Łódź Voivodeship
Tomaszów Mazowiecki County
Łódź Voivodeship (1919–1939)